The Indian national cricket team toured Sri Lanka in January and February 1974 to play two first-class and two limited overs matches against the Sri Lankan national cricket team. There were two further first-class matches against the Sri Lanka Board President's XI. India defeated Sri Lanka at the Sinhalese Sports Club Ground by 6 wickets but the other three first-class games were impacted by the weather and were drawn. As Sri Lanka had not then achieved Test status, the internationals are classified as first-class matches. The Indian team was captained by Ajit Wadekar and Sri Lanka by Anura Tennekoon.

References

External links

1974 in Indian cricket
1974 in Sri Lankan cricket
1974
International cricket competitions from 1970–71 to 1975
Sri Lankan cricket seasons from 1972–73 to 1999–2000